Super Balita sa Umaga Nationwide is the flagship morning newscast of AM station DZBB in the Philippines anchored by Mike Enriquez and Joel Reyes Zobel. The radio program is streaming online on DZBB's Facebook page and is also simulcast nationwide via all GMA Super Radyo stations and on GTV through the program block Dobol B TV.

Hosts
 Mike Enriquez (2007–present)
 Joel Reyes Zobel (2007–present)
 Orly Trinidad (2011–present) (substitute for Enriquez and Zobel)
 Melo Del Prado (2011–present) (substitute for Enriquez and Zobel)
 Weng Dela Peña (2019–present) (substitute for Enriquez and Zobel)
 Rowena Salvacion (2021–present) (substitute for Enriquez and Zobel)
 Kathy San Gabriel (2021–present) (substitute for Enriquez and Zobel)
 Toni Aquino (2022–present) (substitute for Enriquez and Zobel)

Background
The broadcast debuted as Super Balita sa Umaga between 8 and 9 in the morning, running concurrently with Mike Enriquez's radio show Saksi sa Dobol B. The newscast was moved to 7 a.m. on January 8, 2007, after DZBB changed their early morning programming, and it began airing nationally via satellite. Joel Reyes Zobel, the station's program anchor and the voiceover for 24 Oras, then joined Enriquez as his co-anchor.

Along with Saksi sa Dobol B, the newscast started its simulcast under Dobol B sa News TV block on GMA News TV when it launched on February 28, 2011. The simulcast's first run ended on September 7, 2012, and the following month it was replaced by the morning show Kape at Balita. On April 24, 2017, after 4 years of hiatus, the newscast returned to TV as part of the second reiteration of Dobol B sa News TV, which is seen on GMA News TV.

On February 22, 2021, coinciding with the rebranding of GMA News TV to GTV, the program has also carried to the newly renamed Dobol B TV programming block.

On August 13, 2022, Super Balita sa Umaga Nationwide began airing at weekends even though the branding remains Super Balita sa Umaga. All Super Radyo AM stations as well as hybrid Barangay FM Super Radyo stations in Kalibo and General Santos now broadcast the newscast's Saturday and Sunday editions.

Current segments
Bantay Panahon/Bantay Bagyo - The weather segment and radio counterpart of IM Ready: GMA Weather segment of GMA News programs on TV

Occasional segments
Bantay Bakuna (formerly Bantay COVID-19 and Bantay nCoV) - The segment in which the hosts presents the current situation about the COVID-19 vaccination program.
Bantay Bulkan - The segment about the latest updates on volcanic eruptions.
Bantay Baha - This segment about the latest updates on floods.

See also
GMA News and Public Affairs
Super Radyo DZBB
Dobol A sa Dobol B
Dobol B TV
Super Balita sa Tanghali Nationwide
Saksi sa Dobol B
Unang Hirit
24 Oras

References

Philippine radio programs
2007 radio programme debuts
GMA Integrated News and Public Affairs shows
GMA News TV original programming